Leon Clifford McLaughlin (May 30, 1925 – October 27, 2014) was an American football player and coach. He played professionally as a center for five seasons with the Los Angeles Rams of National Football League (NFL).  After his playing career he served as assistant coach for several NFL teams: Pittsburgh Steelers (1966–68), Los Angeles Rams (1971–72), Detroit Lions (1973–74), Green Bay Packers (1975–76), New England Patriots (1977), and St. Louis / Phoenix Cardinals (1978–89).  McLaughlin was the head football coach at San Fernando Valley State College—now known as California State University, Northridge—from 1969 to 1970.

Head coaching record

}

References

External links
 
 

1925 births
2014 deaths
American football centers
Cal State Northridge Matadors football coaches
Detroit Lions coaches
Los Angeles Rams coaches
Los Angeles Rams players
Green Bay Packers coaches
New England Patriots coaches
Phoenix Cardinals coaches
Pittsburgh Steelers coaches
St. Louis Cardinals (football) coaches
Stanford Cardinal football coaches
UCLA Bruins football players
Washington State Cougars football coaches
Western Conference Pro Bowl players
Players of American football from San Diego
Players of American football from Santa Monica, California